Hansas Gecas (24 September 1899 –  Unknown) was a Lithuanian footballer who competed in the 1924 Summer Olympics, they lost that match 0-9 against Switzerland and did not advance any further in the tournament, two days later they played Egypt in a friendly in Paris and lost 0-10, Hansas did not play international football again.

References

1899 births
Lithuanian footballers
Lithuania international footballers
Footballers at the 1924 Summer Olympics
Olympic footballers of Lithuania
Association football forwards
Year of death missing